1st Searchlight Battery was a United States Marine Corps unit formed during the Vietnam War to monitor the "Electronic Wall of Defense" that was set up along the Vietnamese Demilitarized Zone.  They fell under the 12th Marine Regiment and the 3rd Marine Division.

History

1st Searchlight Battery was a new unit organized, supervised and controlled by the United States Secretary of Defense, Robert McNamara and was part of the "Electronic Wall of Defense".
 
The Battery began at Marine Corps Base Twentynine Palms, California. It was the first unit in the history of the Marine Corps with infrared/xeon arc technology searchlights.
 
There were 122 men in the Battery: 6 Officers, 113 Enlisted and 3 Enlisted U.S. Navy Corpsmen. Commanding Officer was Captain Victor B. Snider.
 
All personnel had "Secret" security clearance.

Vietnam
On June 27, 1967, the Battery arrived in Da Nang, South Vietnam. At 05:30 on June 28 it departed Da Nang for Đông Hà Combat Base, arriving there on June 29. The Battery HQ was built in Đông Hà.

Attached to 12th Marine Regiment, 3d Marine Division (Rein) FMF.

Equipment

There were 18 M274 Mechanical Mules converted with generators and the searchlight. Each searchlight had a 23" Dual Blade. They had infrared (viewed with M-18 binoculars) and white light capability. The white light had a Xenon Arc, with 75 million candlepower.
 
On July 3 the Battery began deployment of the 3 platoons to seven areas of the Quảng Trị Province/I Corps:  Con Thien, Cửa Việt, Khe Sanh, Gio Linh, Đông Hà, Cam Lộ, Camp Carroll and Thừa Thiên Provinces: (Phu Bai and Camp Evans).
 
The primary use of the searchlight was for perimeter defense. The lights were also used in six major combat operations with excellent results.

Combat history
Significant operations participated in:

External links
 About the group

Military units and formations of the United States Marine Corps
Inactive units of the United States Marine Corps